Richard Clive Desmond (born 8 December 1951) is a British publisher, businessman and former pornographer.

According to the 2021 Sunday Times Rich List, Desmond was the 107th richest person in the United Kingdom. He is the founder of Northern & Shell, a publisher known for running The Health Lottery and for having owned a variety of pornographic titles and of celebrity magazines (including OK! and New!), Britain's Channel 5, pornographic television network Portland, and Express Newspapers. 

In 2020, Desmond was involved in controversy after pressuring the Secretary of State for Housing, Communities and Local Government Robert Jenrick to overrule the Planning Inspectorate and approve a housing development for Desmond's company. The timing of the decision saved the company £40 million but was later overturned.

Early life
Desmond was born in Hampstead, London, into a Jewish family, the youngest of three children, and was raised in Edgware, in north west London. His father was descended from Latvian Jews, and his mother was of Ukrainian-Jewish descent. His father, Cyril, was at one time managing director of cinema advertising company Pearl & Dean. An ear infection caused the sudden loss of Cyril's hearing and, according to Richard, he used to take him along, when he was no more than three years old, to act as "his ears" in business meetings, where he ostensibly acquired his "first taste of business dealings". After Cyril lost a significant amount of family money to gambling, his parents divorced and 11-year-old Desmond moved with his mother, Millie, into a flat above a garage; he has described his impoverished early adolescence as a time when he was "very fat and very lonely".

Desmond was educated at Edgware Junior School and Christ's College, Finchley.

Early publishing career
Desmond left school at 15 and started working in the classified advertisements section of the Thomson Group, while playing the drums at gigs after a day's work. After moving to another company, he became the advertising manager for the music magazine company Beat Publications, the publisher of Beat Instrumental. Desmond owned two record shops by the time he was 21. In the mid-1970s, Desmond combined his interest in music and advertising to found, with Ray Hammond, International Musician and Recording World, a monthly magazine for musicians which expanded to have editions in the UK, US, Australia, Japan and Germany. This was followed by the publication of Home Organist, whose editor contributed the old-school motto  ('Nothing is difficult for the strong' – it was Disraeli's motto), still used by the Northern & Shell publishing group. Desmond eventually bought out Hammond.

Northern & Shell began publication of the celebrity OK! magazine as a monthly in 1993, later becoming a weekly in March 1996. It is the largest weekly magazine in the world, with 23 separate editions from the US to Australia to Azerbaijan and with a readership in excess of 31 million. It was originally an imitation of Hello! magazine but now outsells its rival.

Pornography
In 1982, Northern & Shell began to publish the UK edition of Penthouse, although the licensing deal ended in the 1990s. The company soon began to publish a range of pornographic magazines itself including Asian Babes, Readers Wives and Barely Legal, numbering 45 such titles in all when they were eventually sold. During the 1980s, Desmond ran a premium rate phone sex company until 1988 when he sold the business after British Telecom raised concerns about the content.

Desmond's Northern & Shell launched The Fantasy Channel in 1995. It was one of the first pornographic channels available on satellite television in the UK, competing against other channels available on cable. The channel was later rebranded as Television X. By 2003, Desmond's company had expanded to broadcasting seven channels, with plans to launch six more and the business was described as "extremely lucrative", generating £17m of the £60m operating profits of Northern & Shell. A website, fantasy121.com, was also launched.

Desmond put the magazines up for sale in 2001 in an attempt to distance himself from pornography and employed a spin doctor to try and rebrand himself. He said in 2003 in a television programme, The Real Richard Desmond (Channel 4): "Would it be better to be a former pornographer rather than a pornographer? I'm probably being more honest by keeping them. They serve a need." In February 2004, in a move that some media outlets interpreted as an attempt to improve his image in view of his bid for The Daily Telegraph. Desmond sold the pornographic magazine business to Remnant Media for approximately £10 million.

Desmond was apparently "wounded" by references to himself as a pornographer. Desmond has emphasised that his material has been available through WHSmith and Freeview, saying that: "If it was pornography you would end up in prison because pornography is illegal". A headline in the Evening Standard in 2000 said "Porn Publisher to Buy Express" in reference to Desmond. In a 2002 interview for BBC Newsnight with Jeremy Paxman, Tony Blair was asked if it were appropriate to accept a controversial £100,000 donation from Desmond due to Desmond's links with the pornography industry, to which Blair replied "if someone is fit and proper to own one of the major national newspaper groups in the country then there is no reason why we would not accept donations from them". 

Northern & Shell's business interests in pornography ended in April 2016 when Portland Television, established in 1995, the broadcaster of Television X and the Red Hot channels, was sold for under £1 million in a management buyout.

Desmond has often been referred to as "Richard 'Dirty' Desmond" or "Dirty Des" in Private Eye magazine due to Northern & Shell formerly owning pornographic magazines and television channels.

In November 2021, The Guardian reported that Desmond was upset at his Wikipedia entry using the word "pornographer" and had instructed lawyers to get the term removed because, in his opinion, the phrase "only refers to publishers of illegal or obscene material".

Alleged involvement with New York mafia
According to The Guardian, Desmond had made a deal in 1991 with Norman Chanes for running advertisements in his pornographic magazines for telephone sex lines run by Chanes' mafia associate, Richard Martino of the Gambino crime family. According to the BBC, Martino was "widely reported" to be linked to the mafia, but Desmond did not know. The deal reportedly left the Americans out of pocket and after Desmond refused to pay compensation, his employee was kidnapped and assaulted in New York. Desmond called this account "a fantasy", but encouraged his employee to report the incident to the police and hire a bodyguard to protect himself. In February 2005, The Guardian reported that the claim Desmond had received death threats from the New York Gambino mafia family was contained in affidavits from FBI agents released during Martino's trial relating to the fraudulent use of the telephone lines. Desmond has denied the whole episode; he asserted there was no evidence he knew about the fraud perpetrated by Martino.

Express Newspapers
In November 2000, Northern & Shell acquired Express Newspapers from United News & Media for £125 million, enlarging the group to include the Daily and Sunday Express titles, the Daily Star and Daily Star Sunday (which Desmond started), and the Irish Daily Star (owned jointly with the Irish Independent News & Media group). The Daily and Sunday Express each sell around 700,000 copies per issue. The Daily Star was the only national paper to increase sales year on year with an 18% increase from September 2008 to September 2009 and circulation figures of around 850,000, largely due to aggressive pricing policies which significantly undercut competitors such as The Sun.

After buying Express Newspapers, Desmond became embroiled in a feud with Viscount Rothermere, publisher of the Daily Mail, the rival to the Daily Express, largely derived from stories relating to Rothermere's private life. The Evening Herald reported in 2003 that Desmond was using the Express as a vehicle for his racist views. Once, when asked if he was racist, he commented "No. I just don't trust darkies or poofs".

In 2014 the Financial Times referred to the Desmond-owned Express running "apparently repetitive coverage of immigration, freak weather events and theories about the death of Diana, Princess of Wales." Commenting at the Leveson Inquiry in January 2012, Desmond said: "There has been speculation that Diana was killed by the royal family [...] The speculation has gone on and on. I don’t know the answer." The Times reported his newspapers had repeatedly published such claims. For its defamatory articles covering the disappearance of Madeleine McCann, which numbered a hundred, the Express paid damages of £550,000 to the toddler's parents in 2008. However, in his appearance at the Leveson Inquiry, Desmond said the Express had been "scapegoated" by the Press Complaints Commission (PCC), who had "failed to provide us with any guidance" and were thus implicitly responsible for the defamatory articles. According to Desmond, the PCC was a "useless organisation run by people who wanted tea and biscuits and by phone hackers; it was run by people who wanted to destroy us." In 2015, when asked in a BBC interview if he regretted the Expresss coverage of McCann's disappearance, he said: "No, I think we reported it very fairly."

In April 2004, the Daily Express reverted to supporting the Conservatives, after a period backing Labour. On the same day, Desmond attacked The Daily Telegraph (with which he was a joint venture partner in the West Ferry newspaper printing plant), then considering accepting a takeover by the German Axel Springer group, and asked if they were keen on being run by Nazis. According to Desmond, in an exchange at the meeting, all Germans are Nazis. Desmond reportedly harangued The Daily Telegraph chief executive and associates in faux German at a business meeting and imitated Adolf Hitler. The Telegraph executives walked out of the meeting. This incident was described as a form of institutionalised racism prevalent among newspaper proprietors. Previously, in August 2001, the National Union of Journalists' chapel at the Express & Star also condemned Desmond for the newspaper's "hysterical and racist" campaign against asylum seekers; this campaign was also criticised by Yasmin Alibhai-Brown, writing for The Independent in June 2002.

In August 2005, the former executive editor of the Daily Express, Ted Young, made an out-of-court settlement with Desmond's company ahead of an industrial tribunal. This related to an incident with Desmond in the newsroom in September 2004, during which Desmond was said to have hit the journalist. Desmond has repeatedly denied the claims.

In 2008, Northern & Shell reported a turnover of £483.9 million.

Libel case
Litigation began at the High Court on 6 July 2009 over claims in journalist Tom Bower's joint biography of Conrad Black and Barbara Amiel, Conrad and Lady Black: Dancing on the Edge, that Desmond had made a "humiliating climbdown" over an Express story at the end of 2002 on the state of Lord Black's finances, which it was alleged Desmond had ordered to be written.

This claim of a weakening of Desmond's "super-tough" reputation as a businessman was viewed as defamation by Desmond. Bower denied libel on the grounds of the story being "substantially true". The following day, the presiding judge The Hon. Mr Justice Eady, discharged the jury as "fundamental" evidence and legal submissions had emerged. The new jury later found in favour of Bower.

A biography of Desmond, Rough Trader, was written by Bower and printed in 2006, but still awaits publication.

Developments since 2010
In July 2010, Desmond bought the UK terrestrial-television channel Channel 5, which was losing money, from RTL Group, for £103.5 million. "Never before", wrote Tom Bower in The Guardian at the time, "has a government regulator (Ofcom) lowered the threshold for the suitability of the prospective owner of a TV channel enough for someone like Desmond to control a potentially lucrative franchise".

In the year before Desmond acquired Channel 5, it had made a total loss of €41m (£37m), or a €9m loss at an operating level. The new owner immediately proceeded to cut costs, starting with the dismissal of seven of Channel 5's nine directors, beginning a drive to eliminate "£20m of yearly expenses". The stated plan included the dismissal of up to 80 of the network's 300 employees. Desmond also significantly increased the programming budget. In the first full year of Desmond's ownership, the broadcaster saw a 28% surge in revenue - the biggest TV advertising haul in its 14-year history - "thanks to factors including the arrival of Big Brother and the return of a major media buying contract with Aegis". He sold Channel 5 to Viacom for £463m in May 2014.

By December 2010, his privately owned publishing venture employed more than 2,000 people internationally, according to Desmond. 
In 2010, Desmond was ranked the equal-57th richest man in Britain by The Sunday Times Rich List, with a net worth of £950 million. In 2014, he was ranked 78th and worth £1.2 billion. In 2016, Forbes estimated his fortune at close to $1.49 billion, while the 2016 Sunday Times Rich List reported his net worth at £2.25 billion. According to the Sunday Times Rich List in 2019, Desmond has a net worth of £2.6 billion falling to £2bn in 2020.

Express Newspapers  was sold to Reach plc (formerly Trinity Mirror) in 2018 for £200m, of which £74m was invested in the Express newspapers pension scheme until 2027. 

In 2020, Robert Jenrick, Secretary of State for Housing, Communities and Local Government, accepted that his approval of a £1 billion luxury housing development on Westferry Road, Isle of Dogs, proposed by Desmond, had been unlawful. Desmond sent Jenrick a text message after meeting him at a fundraising dinner stating "We don’t want to give Marxists loads of doe [sic] for nothing!" referring to money which would be owed to Tower Hamlets Council to pay for infrastructure improvements. Jenrick's approval, which was against the advice of the planning inspector, met a deadline which would have saved Desmond £40m. Additionally, the scheme proposed by Desmond only provided 21% affordable housing compared to the minimum target of 35%, which Tower Hamlets Council estimate would have saved Desmond up to £106m. Desmond, whose company had donated to the Conservative Party in 2017, made a further personal donation to the party shortly after the approval was given. The Conservative Party Chairman subsequently apologised to members of the 1922 Committee for having allowed Desmond to sit next to Jenrick and allowing Desmond to lobby him.

Charity work
In 2003, Desmond and Roger Daltrey formed the RD Crusaders, a rock group featuring Desmond on drums, to raise money for charitable causes. Desmond became president of the UK Jewish charity Norwood in 2006. He also donated £2.5m to the £15m children's centre at Moorfields Eye Hospital and his name was attached to it.

Political activity 
In December 2014, during the run-up to the 2015 general election, Desmond was reported to have agreed to donate £300,000 to the UK Independence Party. There was speculation at the time that a further donation could follow, and in April 2015 it was announced that he had given an additional £1 million to the party.

The Health Lottery
In October 2011, Desmond's company Northern and Shell launched the Health Lottery, of which around 20% of turnover goes to charity. The grants, distributed by the People's Health Trust (PHT), help many good causes and the elderly in local communities across the UK. It supports local health causes throughout England, Scotland and Wales. The Health Lottery was to return 20.34p per £1 lottery ticket to good causes, which was compared unfavourably with the National Lottery donating 28p per £1 ticket. Sir Stephen Bubb, then chief executive of the Association of Chief Executives of Voluntary Organisations, accused Desmond of "profiteering on the back of charities". In July 2020 it was announced that the proceeds given to charity was to increase to 25%. In November 2019, Desmond announced his intention to bid for the National Lottery licence when it came up for renewal at the end of the year.

Personal life
Desmond and Janet Robertson were married for 27 years; the couple have a son, Robert. In October 2010, Janet divorced him and Desmond subsequently married Joy Canfield, a former manager for British Airways, in 2012. Joy was pregnant with Desmond's child when Janet divorced him. The couple have two children; daughter Angel Millie (born 2011) and a son, Valentine (born 2015).

The tycoon's autobiography, The Real Deal: The Autobiography of Britain's Most Controversial Media Mogul, was published in June 2015 by Random House. It was ghost-written by Sunday Express editor Martin Townsend. He also provided his voice for the audiobook version. The autobiography received a five-star review in the Desmond-owned Daily Express.

References

External links
 
 Northern & Shell company website
 

1951 births
Living people
20th-century British newspaper publishers (people)
Adult magazine publishers (people)
British mass media owners
Businesspeople from London
Channel 5 (British TV channel)
Conservative Party (UK) donors
English autobiographers
English billionaires
English people of Latvian-Jewish descent
English people of Ukrainian-Jewish descent
English pornographers
English Jews
Northern & Shell
Penthouse (magazine) people
People educated at Christ's College, Finchley
People from Hampstead
UK Independence Party donors